Beitia is a surname. Notable people with the surname include:

 Isaac Beitia (born 1995), Panamanian swimmer
 Joseba Beitia (born 1990), Spanish footballer
 Ruth Beitia (born 1979), Spanish high jumper
 Santiago Beitia (born 1938), Spanish rower
 Xavier Beitia (born 1982), American football placekicker